Judge Archer may refer to:

 Glenn L. Archer Jr. (1929–2011), judge of the U.S. Court of Appeals for the Federal Circuit.
 John Archer (judge) (1598–1682), English judge
 John L'Archers (died 1349), English-born Irish judge
 Lawrence Archer (1820–1910), California county judge for Santa Clara county and progenitor of Kelley Park
 Judge Archer, a 2016 Mandarin-language Chinese period drama martial arts film, see List of Chinese films of 2016

See also
 Archery judge, see Target archery
 Justice Archer (disambiguation)